Louis Becquey (24 September 1760 – 2 May 1849) was a French counter-revolutionary. He was born in Vitry-le-François, Marne, France.

References

1760 births
1849 deaths
People from Vitry-le-François
Politicians from Grand Est
Legitimists
State ministers of France
Members of the Legislative Assembly (France)
Members of the Chamber of Deputies of the Bourbon Restoration
French counter-revolutionaries
Hydraulic engineers
Commandeurs of the Légion d'honneur